Olausson is a surname. Notable people with the surname include:

Carsten Olausson, Swedish footballer
Fredrik Olausson (born 1966), Swedish ice hockey player
Joakim Olausson (born 1995), Swedish footballer
Lars Olausson, a retired Lieutenant Colonel of the Swedish Air Force
Mats Olausson (born 1961), Swedish keyboard player in several bands
Niklas Olausson (born 1986), professional Swedish ice hockey player
Peter Olausson (born 1971), Swedish author